Olga Alekseevna Novikoff  (c. 1842 – 21 April 1925) was an expatriate White Russian author and journalist in Britain

Notable works include The M.P. for Russia.

Her grandson was Russian-born British actor Richard Marner (born Alexander Molchanoff).

References

External links
 
 The M.P. for Russia at The Internet Archive
 Olga Novikoff W. T. Stead (The Review of Reviews, vol. III, February 1891) pp. 123–136

Russian writers
1842 births
1925 deaths
Russian expatriates in England